There are nearly 70 current and former places of worship in the borough of Eastleigh in Hampshire, England.  Various Christian denominations and groups use 55 churches, chapels and halls for worship and other activities, and a further 12 buildings no longer serve a religious function but survive in alternative uses.  Eastleigh is one of 13 local government districts in the county of Hampshire—a large county in central southern England, with a densely populated coastal fringe facing the English Channel and a more rural hinterland.  The borough, which is predominantly urban and suburban in character, is centrally located in the south of the county between the major cities of Southampton and Portsmouth and forms part of the South Hampshire conurbation.  Its main town is also called Eastleigh.

Many settlements in the borough have ancient origins, being recorded in the Domesday Book, and several churches can trace their origins back to that period.  A French-owned alien priory at Hamble-le-Rice controlled three of the oldest churches, all of which survive with varying degrees of alteration; but the ancient chapels at Bishopstoke and North Stoneham have been replaced by newer buildings, and of Botley's medieval church—superseded since the 1830s—only the chancel remains.  Most of the borough's places of worship, though, are from the 19th and 20th centuries.  "For Victorian churches Hampshire is a bumper county", and this applies especially in the Eastleigh area where the sudden growth of Eastleigh town (which "owes its very existence to [a] railway junction" built in 1841) encouraged the Church of England, the Roman Catholic Church and various Nonconformist denominations to provide churches and chapels for the influx of new residents in the town and its rapidly suburbanising hinterland.  Steady population growth continues to the present day, and many new places of worship opened in the 20th century—including churches, chapels and meeting halls for smaller groups such as Spiritualists, Jehovah's Witnesses and Plymouth Brethren.

The 2011 United Kingdom census recorded a majority Christian population in the borough of Eastleigh, and there are no places of worship in the borough for followers of other faiths. The Church of England—the country's Established Church—has the largest stock of church buildings, but many other denominations and groups are represented.  A Roman Catholic mission was established in Eastleigh town in 1885; several Baptist chapels opened in the second half of the 19th century; Methodism was strong locally, with 11 chapels in use by 1940; and the Congregational Church and The Salvation Army have had a constant presence in the area now covered by the borough since the 19th century.  Since the 1960s the group now known as the Plymouth Brethren Christian Church have also established several meeting rooms in the area, although groups with a Brethren character have worshipped locally for much longer.

Historic England has awarded listed status to nine current and three former places of worship in Eastleigh.  A building is defined as "listed" when it is placed on a statutory register of buildings of "special architectural or historic interest" in accordance with the Planning (Listed Buildings and Conservation Areas) Act 1990. The Department for Digital, Culture, Media and Sport, a Government department, is responsible for this; Historic England, a non-departmental public body, acts as an agency of the department to administer the process and advise the department on relevant issues. There are three grades of listing status. Grade I, the highest, is defined as being of "exceptional interest"; Grade II* is used for "particularly important buildings of more than special interest"; and Grade II, the lowest, is used for buildings of "special interest".

Overview of the borough and its places of worship

Southampton Water, a tidal estuary between The Solent and the city of Southampton, forms the southern boundary of the borough; on the other side is the district of New Forest. Clockwise from the southwest, there are land boundaries with the unitary authority of Southampton, the borough of Test Valley, the City of Winchester and the borough of Fareham. The borough's character is largely urban and suburban, and the estimated population as of mid-2016 was nearly 130,000. The main towns are Eastleigh, Chandler's Ford and Hedge End; most residents live in these settlements or in the villages of Bishopstoke, Botley, Bursledon, Fair Oak, Hamble-le-Rice, Horton Heath, Netley and West End. The borough is long from north to south and narrow; the southern part, bounded to the east by the River Hamble, gives the borough a coastline on Southampton Water.

The first Christian churches in the area were founded during the Saxon era, but no trace remains of the original 10th-century chapels at North Stoneham or Bishopstoke.  These were recorded in the Domesday survey of 1086, along with the church at Botley (originally dedicated to All Saints; later to St Bartholomew); but no mention was made of the ancient churches at Hamble-le-Rice, Hound and Bursledon.  St Andrew's Church at Hamble was first recorded in 1128 and was an alien priory controlled by Tiron Abbey in France; this explains its unusual dimensions, as its chancel and nave were effectively two separate churches attached end to end, serving the priory and local parishioners respectively.  The priory also held St Mary's Church at Hound, "a complete Early English Gothic hamlet church" which is mostly 13th-century in form but which retains some stonework from an older building, and St Leonard's Church at Bursledon—built in the second half of the 12th century but much altered, although a remodelling of 1888 restored some features lost in "large-scale alterations of 1832–33".  The "intriguing" St Nicholas' Church at North Stoneham is medieval and has some work from  1230, but its appearance has also changed greatly over the centuries.

As well as the restoration and remodelling of the ancient Church of England parish churches, much new churchbuilding was carried out in the villages in the 19th century, especially during the Victorian era, to provide new places of worship for Anglicans.  The old church south of Botley village was replaced by one in the village centre in 1836, extended in 1859 and further reworked in the 1890s.  It took its predecessor's original dedication to All Saints.  Bishopstoke's original church was replaced in 1825, but its tower became structurally unsafe and a new, larger church was built on a new site in 1889–91.  Hound's tiny church, although still in use, was superseded by a larger one nearer the centre of the parish's population in Netley in 1885–86.  The sudden growth of the railway town of Eastleigh between 1860 and 1900—from nothing to a population of over 7,000, with further rapid growth thereafter—also prompted a period of rapid churchbuilding by the Church of England, both in the town and in nearby settlements which became suburbanised.  The Church of the Resurrection (closed 1978) near Eastleigh railway station was started in 1868 and became the town's parish church in 1905; All Saints served the south side of town from 1908 and is now the parish church; Chandler's Ford, originally in North Stoneham parish, had a tin tabernacle from 1881, replaced by a permanent church in 1904; St Thomas's Church at Fair Oak near Bishopstoke was built in 1863; Hedge End's church, with its prominent spire, opened in 1874; and at nearby West End, a small chapel of 1838 was replaced on a larger scale fifty years later.  As suburban growth continued in the second half of 20th century, Chandler's Ford, Bishopstoke, Hedge End and Bursledon all grew large enough for additional Anglican churches to be built—in 1960, 1962, the early 1990s and 2000 respectively—and the late 20th-century Boyatt Wood estate in Eastleigh was served by the newly built St Peter's Church from 1991.

Roman Catholics in the area were served from 1882 by a mission chapel founded in Eastleigh town by St Peter's Church, Winchester.  It became independent three years later, and the first stone of the present Holy Cross Church was laid on 14 September 1901.  A church was built at Chandler's Ford in 1938 and substantially extended just over 50 years later; for some years it was part of Eastleigh's parish.  Both are now part of a larger parish which includes the church at Fair Oak, opened in 1978.  In the south of the borough, a church was provided at Netley in 1949, while Hedge End and West End's Catholic churches were founded by Fr Dennis Walshe, priest-in-charge of the large parish of Bitterne from 1944.  After World War II he bought sites in both villages, as well as at Thornhill in Southampton, for future churches.  A joint parish was formed covering both Hedge End and West End; its first parish priest built St Brigid's Church in West End and the original Church of the Assumption in Hedge End, which was replaced in 1975 by the present building.

The Methodist Church of Great Britain documented all the chapels it owned as of 1940 in a statistical return published in 1947.  Within the boundaries of the present borough of Eastleigh at that time, there were 11 chapels representing the denomination's three historic strands: Wesleyanism, Primitive Methodism and the United Methodist Church.  Crowdhill, Eastleigh town, Netley and West End had chapels which were originally Wesleyan; there were Primitive Methodist churches at Chandler's Ford and West End; and Bishopstoke had two United Methodist chapels, while there was one each in Eastleigh town, Hedge End and West End.  Only one of these buildings is still occupied by a Methodist congregation, another four are no longer in religious use, and the others have been demolished.  Hedge End Methodist Church was registered as a United Methodist Church in 1924, replacing an older building, and remains in use.  In Eastleigh, the Wesleyan church was built in 1893 and the United Methodist (originally Bible Christian) chapel in Leigh Road opened in 1904.  The latter closed in 1959 and was sold for conversion; the 1893 building served the town's Methodists from that year until its demolition in the early 1980s, when it was replaced by a new church (St Andrew's) nearby.  There was also a short-lived Primitive Methodist chapel in the town.  The Wesleyan chapels at Crowdhill and Netley still stand but were deregistered in 1980 and 2011 respectively. Chandler's Ford's original Primitive Methodist chapel of 1900 also survives in alternative use but was replaced with a new church nearby in 1957, and a new Methodist church opened in Bishopstoke in 1959 to supersede the two buildings there.  None of West End's three chapels survive; they were at Burnett's Lane, Chapel Road and Swaythling Road.

The United Reformed Church denomination, formed from the amalgamation of the Congregational Church and the Presbyterian Church of England in 1972, is represented in Chandler's Ford and Hedge End; both causes were originally Congregational.  Another chapel in Bursledon is no longer in use, and in Eastleigh the former United Reformed church has been demolished, having been deregistered in 1993.  The town has a modern Salvation Army citadel, though, and the original premises on the High Street still stand: built in 1887, the hall is now the town's museum.  A large new Salvation Army community centre and church opened in 2014 in Hedge End, again replacing older premises; but the cause in Fair Oak lasted only four years before its building passed into secular use.  Brethren groups became established in Eastleigh in the 1880s, when a small assembly met regularly in a room in the town's cheese market.  The first Gospel hall was built on the High Street in 1887, and another was registered on Northlands Road in 1908.  The meeting room at The Crescent dates from 1967 and is now part of the Brethren sect known as the Plymouth Brethren Christian Church.  Since 1989 the main regional meeting hall for this group has been at Chestnut Avenue in the south of the town, and there are smaller meeting rooms at Hedge End, West End, Chandler's Ford and Allbrook.

Religious affiliation
According to the 2011 United Kingdom census, 125,199 lived in the borough of Eastleigh.  Of these, 61.89% identified themselves as Christian, 0.78% were Muslim, 0.68% were Sikh, 0.66% were Hindu, 0.28% were Buddhist, 0.07% were Jewish, 0.4% followed another religion, 28.47% claimed no religious affiliation and 6.77% did not state their religion.  The proportions of Christians and people who followed no religion were higher than the figures in England as a whole (59.38% and 24.74% respectively).  Islam, Judaism, Hinduism, Sikhism and Buddhism had a lower following in the borough than in the country overall: in 2011, 5.02% of people in England were Muslim, 1.52% were Hindu, 0.79% were Sikh, 0.49% were Jewish and 0.45% were Buddhist.

Administration

Anglican churches
With one exception, all Anglican churches in the borough are part of the Anglican Diocese of Winchester, which is based at Winchester Cathedral.  The diocese has 16 deaneries plus the cathedral's own separate deanery.  Eastleigh Deanery is responsible for the churches in  Bishopstoke (St Mary and St Paul), Boyatt Wood, Bursledon (St Leonard and St Paul), Chandler's Ford (St Boniface and St Martin-in-the-Wood at Hiltingbury), Eastleigh town (All Saints and St Francis), Fair Oak, Hamble, Hedge End (St John the Evangelist and St Luke), Hound and West End.  St Nicolas Church at North Stoneham is part of Southampton Deanery.  All Saints Church at Botley is administered by the Bishop's Waltham Deanery of the Anglican Diocese of Portsmouth, which is based at Portsmouth Cathedral.

Roman Catholic churches
The Catholic churches in Chandler's Ford, Eastleigh town, Fair Oak, Hedge End, Netley and West End are part of the Roman Catholic Diocese of Portsmouth, whose seat is the Cathedral of St John the Evangelist in Portsmouth.  St Edward the Confessor's Church at Chandler's Ford, Holy Cross Church in Eastleigh and St Swithun Wells Church at Fair Oak are three of the six churches in St Swithun Wells parish, which is part of the Three Rivers Pastoral Area of Deanery 4 in the Diocese.   The parish covers a large area of mostly rural land in West Hampshire, from the villages of the Meon Valley in the east to the county boundary with Wiltshire in the west, and the northern suburbs of Southampton in the south to the A30 road and villages around Winchester to the north.  The churches of Our Lady of the Assumption at Hedge End and St Brigid at West End are in the Hedge End parish and the Southampton East Pastoral Area of Deanery 8.  This parish covers the suburban villages of Hedge End and West End and the nearby villages of Botley and Boorley Green.  The parish of Netley, served by the Church of the Annunciation, is in the same pastoral area and deanery.  Its boundaries are the River Hamble, Southampton Water, the Southampton city boundary and the M27 motorway; the villages of Bursledon, Hamble, Hound, Netley and Old Netley are included.

Other denominations
Three of the borough's four Methodist churches—at Bishopstoke, Chandler's Ford and Eastleigh—are part of the 17-church Winchester, Eastleigh & Romsey Methodist Circuit.  Hedge End Methodist Church is in the Southampton Methodist Circuit.  Eastleigh and Horton Heath Baptist Churches and West End Free Church belong to the Southern Counties Baptist Association.  Emmanuel Baptist Church in Eastleigh is a member of the Old Baptist Union, a "small group of evangelical Baptist churches" established in 1880 whose doctrines are based on those of the original General Baptists of the 17th century.  Allbrook Evangelical Free Church and Hedge End Strict Baptist Chapel are part of GraceNet UK, an association of Reformed Evangelical Christian churches and organisations.  Bishopstoke Evangelical Church belongs to two Evangelical groups: the Fellowship of Independent Evangelical Churches (FIEC), a pastoral and administrative network of about 500 churches with an evangelical outlook, and Affinity (formerly the British Evangelical Council), a network of conservative Evangelical congregations throughout Great Britain.  Eastleigh Spiritualist Church belongs to the Spiritualists' National Union and is within the organisation's Southern District, which covers Hampshire, the Isle of Wight, Dorset and Wiltshire.

Listed status

Five churches in the borough are Grade II*-listed and seven (including two former churches) are listed at Grade II.  As of February 2001, there were 179 listed buildings in the borough of Eastleigh: none with Grade I status, 9 listed at Grade II* and 170 with Grade II status.

Current places of worship

Former places of worship

Notes

References

Bibliography

 (Available online in 14 parts; Guide to abbreviations on page 6)

Eastleigh
Eastleigh
Eastleigh
Eastleigh, Places of worship
Borough of Eastleigh